Hammerhead is a Minneapolis-based noise rock band active in the early 1990s. Members went on to form the band Vaz.

History
Hammerhead was formed in Moorhead, Minnesota in the early 1990s, with members Paul Erickson, Jeff Mooridian Jr. and Paul Sanders, later moving to Minneapolis. The band released extensively through Amphetamine Reptile Records. Their major breakthrough album Duh the Big City garnered them critical acclaim, however after its release Paul Sanders left the group. The remaining members went on to  form Vaz after experimenting with other line-ups.

In 2010 the band reunited and released an EP of new material, Memory Hole EP, the following year. In 2014 they released a new EP, Global Depression, and in August 2015 they published New Directionz, their first full-length album since regrouping in 2010.

Discography
Full Discography including 7" and splits

Albums
 Ethereal Killer LP/CD (Amphetamine Reptile Records, 1993, ARR 36/226, amrep 012)
 Into the Vortex LP/CD (Amphetamine Reptile Records, 1994, ARR 50/323,amrep 026)
 Duh, the Big City LP/CD (Amphetamine Reptile Records, 1996, ARR/ARRCD 69/012 amrep 042)
 New Directionz (2015)

Singles
 Peep 7" (Amphetamine Reptile Records, 1991, scale 42)  picture disc, research and development series
 Load King 7" (Amphetamine Reptile Records, 1992, scale 46) tour only
 Evil Twin 10" (Amphetamine Reptile Records, 1993, scale 61)  tour only
 Earth I Won't Miss 7" (Amphetamine Reptile Records, year ?, scale 70)  tour only

Splits
 split 7 (OXO Records, 1993, OXO 008)
 Porn No. 1 7" (Amphetamine Reptile Records, 1995, scale 72)

EPs
 Evil Twin 10"/MCD (Amphetamine Reptile Records, 1993, ARR 47/306,amrep 024)
 Memory Hole EP (Amphetamine Reptile Records, 2011) tour and digital release.
 Global Depression (Learning Curve Records, 2014) tour and digital release.

References

American noise rock music groups
Amphetamine Reptile Records artists